

The Women's Individual W1/W2 archery competition at the 2004 Summer Paralympics was held from 21 to 25 September at the Olympic Baseball Centre (Athens).

The event was won by Paola Fantato, representing .

Results

Ranking Round

Competition bracket

References

W
2004 in women's archery